This is a list of churches in Kent, a county in South East Region of England. There is a mixture of Christian denominations.

East Kent
Ashford - St Teresa's Roman Catholic Church
Ashford (South) - St Simon Stock Roman Catholic Church
Bapchild - St Lawrence Church
Blean - Favour House Church
Blean - St Cosmus and St Damian's Church
Bobbing - St Bartholomew Church
Borden - St Peter & St Paul Church
Bradstowe - Shrine of Our Lady
Bredgar - St John the Baptist Church
Brenzett - St Eanswith's Church
Brookland - St Augustine's Church
Canterbury - St Mary Bredin Church
Canterbury - Canterbury Baptist Church
Canterbury - Cathedral and Metropolitical Church of Christ at Canterbury

Canterbury - The City Church
Canterbury - Holy Cross Church
Canterbury - St Augustines Church
Canterbury - St Dunstan's Church
Canterbury - St Stephen's Parish Church
Canterbury - St Martin's and St Paul's Church
Canterbury - St Thomas of Canterbury Roman Catholic Church
Canterbury - Shrine of Our Lady Church
Dover - St Mary's Church
Dover - St Paul's RC
Eastchurch - All Saints Church
Faversham - St Mary of Charity, Faversham
Faversham - St Catherine's Church, Preston-next-Faversham
Folkestone - St Mary and St Eanswythe's Church
Hartlip - St Michael & All Angels Church
Harty - St Thomas the Apostle
Herne Bay - Christ Church
Herne Bay - St Mary's Church
Hernhill - St Michael's Church
Iwade - All Saints Church
Lower Halstow - St Margaret of Antioch Church
Lynsted - St Peter & St Paul Church
Manston, Kent - St Catherine's Church
Margate - Holy Trinity Church
Milton Regis - Holy Trinity Church
Murston - All Saints Church
Newington - St Mary The Virgin Church
Ospringe - Church of St Peter and St Paul
Queenborough - Holy Trinity Church
Rainham - St Margaret's Church
Rodmersham - St Nicholas' Church
Seasalter - St Alphege Church
Seasalter - Seasalter Christian Centre (linked to St Alphege Church)
Sittingbourne - St. Michael the Archangel Church
Sittingbourne - St Mary's Church
Sittingbourne - Wesley Methodist Church
Sittingbourne - United Reformed Church
Sittingbourne - Catholic Church of the Sacred Heart
Sittingbourne - Holy Trinity Church
Stockbury - St Mary Magdalene Church
Teynham - St Mary's Church
Tonge - St Giles Church
Tunstall - St John the Baptist Church
Upchurch - St Mary The Virgin Church
Walmer - Old St Mary's Church
Walmer - St Saviour's Church
Walmer - St Mary's Church
Westgate - St James' Parish Church
Whitfield - Church of St. Peter
Whitstable - Whitstable Baptist Church
Whitstable - The Harbour Church
Whitstable - St Alphege Church
Whitstable - St Andrews Church
Whitstable - St John's Wesleyan Methodist Church
Whitstable - St Peter's Church 
Whitstable - United Reform
Whitstable - Catholic Church of Our Lady of the Immaculate Conception
Wye - Church of St Gregory and St. Martin

West Kent
Addington, Kent - St. Margarets
Allhallows - All Saints
Allington - St Nicholas
Aylesford - St Peter and St Paul
Barming - St. Margaret's

Birling - All Saints
Borough Green - Church of the Good Shepherd
Borough Green - Borough Green Baptist Church
Borough Green - St Joseph's Church Borough Green
Brenchley - All Saints Church
Cliffe - St Helen's
Chatham - Chatham Unitarian Church
Chatham - Christ Church, Luton, Chatham
Chatham - The Church of Christ the King
Chatham - Enon Baptist Church
Chatham - Evangelical Church
Chatham - Dockyard Garrison Chapel
Chatham - The Kings Church Medway
Chatham - St. George's Chapel
Chatham - St. Marys Island Church
Chatham - St. Michael's R.C Church
Chatham - St. Paul with All Saints
Chatham - St. Phillips & St. James
Chatham - St. Simon Stock R.C Church
Chatham - St. Stephen's
Chatham - St. William's
Chatham - United Reformed Church
Chatham - Walderslade Baptist Church
Coxheath - Holy Trinity Church
Cuxton - St. Michael and All Saints
East Malling - St. James
Frindsbury - All Saints
Gillingham - Our Lady of Gillingham Roman Catholic Church
Gillingham - St. Augustine's Church
Gillingham - St. Mark's Church
Gillingham - KingsTreasure Church, Scout Hut
Gillingham - St. Mary Magdalene Church
Gillingham - Wigmore Evangelical Free Church 
Grain - St. James
Gravesend - St Pauls United Reformed Church
Halling - Halling Baptist Church
Horsmonden - St Margaret’s Church
Larkfield - Holy Trinity
Lamberhurst - St Mary's Church
Leybourne - St. Peter & St. Paul's
Maidstone - All Saints Church, Maidstone
Maidstone - Boxley Road Evangelical
Maidstone - Church Of Jesus Christ of Latter Day Saints
Maidstone - Holy Cross Church
Maidstone - Holy Trinity Church - No longer in ecclesiastical use
Maidstone - Jubilee Church
Maidstone - Liberty Church
Maidstone - Maidstone Baptist Church
Maidstone - Roman Catholic Parish of Saint Francis Church
Maidstone - St. Luke's Church
Maidstone - St. Martin’s Church
Maidstone - St Michael and All Angels Church
Markbeech - Holy Trinity Church
Matfield - St Luke's Church
Northfleet - Dover Road United Reformed Church
Rainham - Granary Evangelical Church (Rainham Evangelical Church)
Rochester - Cathedral Church of Christ and the Blessed Virgin Mary
Rochester - St. Bartholomew's Chapel
Rochester - St. Justus
Rochester - St. John Fisher Catholic Church
Rochester - St. Margaret's Church, Rochester
Rochester - St. Nicholas - Former church, now the offices of the Board of Education of the Diocese of Rochester.
Rochester - St. Peter's Church, Rochester
Rochester - Vines United Reformed Church
Royal Tunbridge Wells - Church of King Charles the Martyr
Royal Tunbridge Wells - St. Mark's Church
Sevenoaks - St Nicholas'
Sevenoaks - St Luke's
Sevenoaks, Kippington - St Mary's
Sevenoaks, Kippington - Christ Church United Reformed Church
Sevenoaks - St John the Baptist
Sevenoaks, Riverhead - St Mary the Virgin

Sevenoaks - St Thomas of Canterbury Roman Catholic Church
Sevenoaks - Hope Church
Sevenoaks - The Sevenoaks United Reformed Church
Sevenoaks - The Savenoaks Baptist Church
Sevenoaks - The Sevenoaks Evangelical Church
Snodland - All Saints Church
Snodland - Christ Church
Staplehurst - All Saints Church
Teston - St Peter's and St Paul's Church
Tonbridge - St. Stephen's Parish Church
Tonbridge - St. Peter & St Paul's Parish Church
Tonbridge - St. Saviour's Church
Tonbridge - St. Phillip's Church
Tonbridge - St. Andrew's Church
Tonbridge - Tonbridge Baptist Church
Tonbridge - Christ Church, Tonbridge
Tonbridge - St. Eanswythe's Chapel | Mission Church
Tonbridge - Church on the Way
Tonbridge - Hillsong Church London
Trottiscliffe - St. Peter and St Paul's
Vigo - Vigo Church
Walderslade - St Philip & St James
West Farleigh - All Saints' Church
West Kingsdown - West Kingsdown Baptist Church
West Malling - St. Mary's Church
Wormshill - St. Giles
Wrotham - St. George's Church
Yalding - St Peter and St Paul's Church
Yalding - Yalding Baptist Church

See also
List of places of worship in Sevenoaks District
List of places of worship in Tonbridge and Malling
List of places of worship in Tunbridge Wells (borough)

References
 John E. Vigar's Kent Church Photographs

External links
 Yell.co.uk
 John E. Vigar's Kent Church Photographs
 The History Files Churches of the British Isles

Kent
 List
Churches in Kent